Roy Edwin Glenn, Sr. (June 3, 1914 – March 12, 1971) was an American character actor.

Early life 
Glenn was born in Pittsburg, Kansas on June 3, 1914.

Career
In 1949, Glenn's radio career started in Rocky Jordan – The Adventures of Rocky Jordan The Man With No Name.

Glenn's career spanned five decades, beginning in radio with The Amos 'n' Andy Show and The Jack Benny Show. He made numerous appearances from the dawn of television (including many authoritative roles on The Amos 'n' Andy Show, 1951–53) until 1970.

His first film appearance was in Kelly the Second (1936), followed by Dark Manhattan (1937). His other film credits include The Jackie Robinson Story (1950), Carmen Jones (1954), Porgy and Bess (1959), The Sound and the Fury (1959), A Raisin in the Sun (1961), with Sidney Poitier, Ruby Dee and Claudia McNeil, and a memorable turn as Mr. Prentice (the father of Poitier's character) in the 1967 film Guess Who's Coming to Dinner. Roy Glenn's last big screen appearance was in Support Your Local Gunfighter (1971).

Personal life 
Glenn's wife was Pauline "Lilla" (née Fractious). They have three children, Roy Glenn Jr., Darryl Ward Glenn, and Renatta Darlene Glenn.

Glenn died from a heart attack brought on by cardiovascular disease in Los Angeles, California on March 12, 1971, at the age of 56.

Filmography 

 Kelly the Second (1936) as Fight Spectator (uncredited)
 Dark Manhattan (1937) as Harry Patton (uncredited)
 Uncle Tom's Bungalow (1937) as Uncle Tom (voice, uncredited)
 Slave Ship (1937) as Slave in Ship's Hold (uncredited)
 Life Begins in College (1937) as Singing Porter (uncredited)
 Song of the South (1946) as Br'er Frog (voice, uncredited)
 Half-Pint Pygmy as Pygmy (voice, uncredited)
 The Jackie Robinson Story (1950) as Mr. Gaines, Attorney (uncredited)
 Chicago Calling (1951) as Shoeshine Man (uncredited)
 Lydia Bailey (1952) as Mirabeau
 Affair in Trinidad (1952) as Fisherman (uncredited)
 The Lusty Men (1952) as Cook (uncredited)
 Bomba and the Jungle Girl (1952) as Kaje
 Jungle Drums of Africa (1953) as Naganto, Witch Doctor
 Perils of the Jungle (1953) as Korjah
 So This Is Love (1953) as Man in Negro Congregation (uncredited)
 The Royal African Rifles (1953) as Cpl. John
 The Golden Idol (1954) as Gomo
 Riot in Cell Block 11 (1954) as Guard Delmar
 The Long Wait (1954) as Parking Attendant (uncredited)
 The Raid (1954) as Emmanuel, Mrs. Bishop's Butler (uncredited)
 Killer Leopard (1954) as Daniel
 Jungle Gents (1954) as Omotowa (uncredited)
 Carmen Jones (1954) as Rum Daniels
 Panther Girl of the Kongo (1955, Serial) as Danka
 A Man Called Peter (1955) as The Laborer (uncredited)
 Time Table (1956) as Train Porter (uncredited)
 The Man in the Gray Flannel Suit (1956) as Sgt. Matthews (uncredited)
 Written on the Wind (1956) as Sam
 Three Brave Men (1956) as Charley, Plant Security Guard (uncredited)
 Edge of the City (1957) as Stevedore (uncredited)
 The Green-Eyed Blonde (1957) as Mr. Budlong (uncredited)
 St. Louis Blues (1958) as Bull Neck (uncredited)
 Tarzan's Fight for Life (1958) as Native Chief (uncredited)
 Voice in the Mirror (1958) as Janitor at Flophouse (uncredited)
 The Sound and the Fury (1959) as Job
 Porgy and Bess (1959) as Frazier
 Take a Giant Step (1959) as Minister at Gram's Funeral (uncredited)
 The Adventures of Huckleberry Finn (1960) as Drayman (uncredited)
 A Raisin in the Sun (1961) as Willie Harris
 Sweet Bird of Youth (1962) as Charles (uncredited)
 Where Love Has Gone (1964) as Valerie's Servant (uncredited)
 A Man Called Adam (1966) as Police Detective Sergeant
 Dead Heat on a Merry-Go-Round (1966) as Sergeant Elmer K. Coxe
 The Way West (1967) as Saunders
 Guess Who's Coming to Dinner (1967) as Mr. Prentice
 Hang 'Em High (1968) as Guard #2
 I Love You, Alice B. Toklas! (1968) as Gas Station Attendant
 Finian's Rainbow (1968) as Passion Pilgrim Gospeleer (uncredited)
 ...tick...tick...tick... (1970) as The Drunk
 The Great White Hope (1970) as Pastor
 Support Your Local Gunfighter (1971) as Headwaiter
 Escape from the Planet of the Apes (1971) as Lawyer (final film role)

See also 
 American Federation of Television and Radio Artists

References

External links
 
 
 
 Rocky Jordan radio shows at archive.org
 Encyclopedia of Black Radio in the United States, 1921–1955

1914 births
1971 deaths
Male actors from Kansas
20th-century American male actors
African-American male actors
American male film actors
American male radio actors
American male television actors
American male voice actors
Burials at Inglewood Park Cemetery
People from Pittsburg, Kansas
20th-century African-American people